The title Football Manager of the Year (Trainer des Jahres) has been awarded in Germany since 2002. The award is determined by a poll of German football journalists from the Association of German Sports Journalists (Verband der Deutschen Sportjournalisten) and the publication kicker.

Eligible are German managers and non-German managers coaching in Germany. So far, Louis van Gaal is the only non-German manager to receive the award.

Football Managers of the Year

See also
 Footballer of the Year (Germany)
 German Sportspersonality of the Year

References

German football trophies and awards
Association football manager of the year awards
Awards established in 2002
2002 establishments in Germany